Hugues Naponick Nanmi known as Namni (born 27 April 1983) is a Cameroonian football player who currently has contract with the Faroese football club NSÍ Runavík. He has earlier played for Persikota Tangerang in Indonesia, Kitchee in Hong Kong, Tai Chung in Hong Kong and Tai Po in Hong Kong.

References

External sources
 Profile in HKFA.

Living people
1983 births
Cameroonian footballers
Cameroonian expatriate footballers
Expatriate footballers in Hong Kong
Expatriate footballers in Indonesia
Cameroonian expatriate sportspeople in Hong Kong
NSÍ Runavík players
Association football defenders